Asankrangwa is the capital of  Amenfi West Municipal, a district in the Western Region of Ghana.

References

Populated places in the Western Region (Ghana)